Adesh University (AU) is private university in Bathinda, Punjab, India. The university was established in 2012 under Adesh University Act, 2012 (Punjab Act 6 of 2012). The campus is spread out on 100-acre land.

Associated colleges

 Adesh Institute of Medical Sciences & Research
 Adesh College Of Paramedical Sciences
 Adesh Institute of Pharmacy and Biomedical Sciences
 Adesh College of Nursing
 Adesh College of Pharmacy 
 Adesh Institute Of Dental Sciences & Research

References

External links 
 

Private universities in India
Universities in Punjab, India
Education in Bathinda
2012 establishments in Punjab, India
Educational institutions established in 2012